Malvapevu (also Malvapévu or Vaucluse Island) is a small uninhabited island in Sanma Province of Vanuatu in the Pacific Ocean.

Geography
Malvapevu lies off the eastern coast of Espiritu Santo. The estimated terrain elevation above sea level is some 12 meters.

References

Islands of Vanuatu
Sanma Province
Uninhabited islands of Vanuatu